The 2012–13 season was Ross County's first season in the Scottish Premier League, having been promoted as champions of the Scottish First Division at the end of 2011–12 season. They also competed in the League Cup and the Scottish Cup.

Summary

Season
During season 2012–13 Ross County finished fifth in the Scottish Premier League. They reached the second round of the League Cup and the fourth round of the Scottish Cup.

Results and fixtures

Pre season

Scottish Premier League

Scottish League Cup

Scottish Cup

Player statistics

Captains

Squad 
Last updated 19 May 2013

|}

Disciplinary record
Includes all competitive matches. 
Last updated 19 May 2013

Team statistics

League table

Division summary

Transfers

Players in

Players out

See also
 List of Ross County F.C. seasons

References

Ross County
2012andndash;13